Incisive Media is a B2B information and events business. It is based in London, United Kingdom.

History 
Incisive Media is a business-to-business (B2B) information and events company founded by Tim Weller, in 1994 with the launch of Investment Week.  It acquired Timothy Benn Publishing (owner of Post Magazine) in August 2000. It was listed on the main market of the London Stock Exchange in December 2000 which valued the business at c. £73m.  During the next six years the business completed a number of acquisitions including Matching Hat, Risk Waters, Initiative Europe (Unquote), Search Engine Strategies, Global Professional Media, Asian Venture Capital Journal and Pacific Prospect. However, as a public company it was difficult to take advantage of some of the larger consolidation opportunities that existed, so in December 2006 Tim Weller led a management buyout deal backed by Apax Partners that valued Incisive Media at £275 million.

Within a few months of going private, Incisive Media completed the acquisitions of MSM International and UK publishing business VNU Business Publications Ltd, formerly part of The Nielsen Company, from venture capital group 3i in 2007.  In August 2007 the company completed a $630m deal to acquire ALM, an American magazine publisher that was backed by Bruce Wasserstein, doubling the size of the group again and creating a company with an enterprise value of over $1bn.

However, following the collapse of Lehman Brothers and the downturn in the financial services market, Incisive Media's markets came under significant pressure and the debt levels were no longer sustainable.  In October 2009 Incisive Media announced the refinancing of the Group's debt.

In January 2016 Incisive sold the British magazine Legal Week to the US legal business publisher ALM.

September 11 attacks 
On September 11, 2001, Incisive Media―back then known as Risk Waters―was hosting a conference at Windows on the World, a restaurant located on the 106th and 107th floors of the North Tower of the World Trade Center. At 8:46 a.m. that morning, a hijacked airliner was deliberately flown into the 110-story skyscraper as part of a series of coordinates suicide terrorist attacks, crashing between the 93rd and 99th floors. With all escape routes severed by the impact from Floor 92 and above, the 81 people attending the meeting were trapped and perished either by smoke inhalation or from being incinerated in the fires. A number of Windows occupants, very likely including people from Risk Waters, fell or jumped to their deaths to escape the smoke and flames. At 10:28 a.m., the tower collapsed, killing anybody who was still alive.

Awards 
The group received five nominations for the June 2010 Association of Online Publishers awards, and was voted Digital Publisher of the Year. Also it received the same award in 2013, in 2016  and most recently in 2017. Incisive followed this up with a win for Pensions and Benefits UK at the 2017 UK Conference awards.

References 

Business newspapers published in the United Kingdom
Newspaper companies of the United Kingdom
1994 establishments in England